Foscari is an 1826 historical tragedy by the British writer Mary Russell Mitford. The plot revolves around Francesco Foscari, the son of the Doge of Venice, who is wrongly accused of murder and has to go into exile. It premiered at the Theatre Royal, Covent Garden on 4 November 1826. The original cast included Charles Mayne Young as Foscari, Doge of Venice, Charles Kemble as Francesco Foscari, James Prescott Warde as Count Erizzo, and Daniel Egerton as Donato. 

Mitford began writing the play in 1821 with the Covent Garden company in mind for the characters, but tensions between Charles Kemble and his rival at the theatre William Macready led to a long delay and Macready eventually did not appear. During the delay, the publication of Lord Byron's The Two Foscari based on the same subject, disturbed Mitford as she did not wish to be seen in competition with Byron. During the delay, she wrote another play Julian which was successfully performed at Covent Garden in 1823.

References

Bibliography
  Burwick, Frederick Goslee, Nancy Moore & Hoeveler Diane Long . The Encyclopedia of Romantic Literature. John Wiley & Sons,  2012.
 Nicoll, Allardyce. A History of Early Nineteenth Century Drama 1800-1850. Cambridge University Press, 1930.

1826 plays
West End plays
British plays
Tragedy plays
Historical plays
Plays set in Italy
Plays by Mary Russell Mitford
Plays set in the 15th century